The U is a 2009 documentary film about the University of Miami football program produced by Miami-based media studio Rakontur and directed by Billy Corben.

The film premiered December 12, 2009 after the Heisman Trophy presentation on ESPN as a part of their 30 for 30 documentary series. The U's premiere drew 2.3 million viewers, the most ever for a documentary on the sports cable network until the debut of Pony Excess, a documentary about the Southern Methodist University football scandal in the 1980s.

Home media
This film was released on DVD in 2010, both separately and as part of the 30 for 30 box set. The DVD cover, depicting Michael Irvin, originally had the "U" logo on his helmet, but it was airbrushed from the cover after the University of Miami objected to the logo's use. Excerpts from Florida State University's "Seminole Rap" video that initially appeared in the documentary were also cut from the DVD release.

Sequel
In December 2014, ESPN released a second 30 for 30 film about the Hurricanes' program, The U Part 2. Part 2 documents the second rise to glory of the Miami Hurricanes football team in the late 1990s and early 2000s followed by the eventual fall of the program, due largely to a 2011 scandal involving rogue booster Nevin Shapiro.

References

External links
 Official website
 

American documentary television films
Miami Hurricanes football
30 for 30
2009 television films
2009 films
2009 documentary films
Documentary films about American football
Films directed by Billy Corben
Films shot in Miami
Films set in Miami
2000s English-language films
2000s American films